Seneca Scott (born August 6, 1977) is an American politician who served in the Oklahoma House of Representatives from the 72nd district from 2008 to 2016. Scott is married with two children, and is a member of the Choctaw Nation.

In 2014, Scott agreed to pay a $3,000 civil penalty and make a $8,273 restitution after the Oklahoma State Ethics Commission found he had used campaign funds for personal use.

In 2016, Scott was selected as one of the winners of the Oklahoma Human Rights Award, awarded jointly by the Oklahoma City chapter of the United Nations Association and the Oklahoma Universal Human Rights Alliance.

References

1977 births
21st-century Native American politicians
Living people
Democratic Party members of the Oklahoma House of Representatives
Choctaw Nation of Oklahoma state legislators in Oklahoma
Politicians from Enid, Oklahoma
21st-century American politicians
20th-century Native Americans